Dol-y-bont ("bridge meadow") is a village in Ceredigion, Wales; It lies near Borth, to the north of Llandre.  Dôl is Welsh for "meadow", Bont is Welsh for "bridge".

The village was the birthplace of  Welsh bard and scholar Dewi Teifi (1877–1971), and the retirement location of British physicist C. E. Wynn-Williams (1903–1979).

The area experienced extensive flooding in June 2012.

|-
| class="fn org" | Dôl-y-Bont
| class="adr" | Ceredigion
| class="note" | 
| class="note" | 
|- class="vcard"
|}

References

Villages in Ceredigion